The Queen City Pace was a Canadian harness race for three-year-old Standardbred pacers run each year at Greenwood Raceway in Toronto, Ontario, except in 1978 where it was run at Mohawk Racetrack. The Queen City Pace was run from 1964 through 1983 after which it was replaced by the North America Cup.

Historical race events
The race was run in two divisions in 1974 and 1975.
In 1983, that year's race, which would be the last Queen City Pace, was won by Ralph Hanover who went on to win the U.S. Pacing Triple Crown.

Distances
1964 - 1 1/16 miles
1965 - 1/ 1/8 miles
1966-1983 - 1 mile

Records
 Most wins by a driver
 2 – Joe O'Brien  (1973, 1974) & Ron Waples (1979, 1983)

 Most wins by a trainer
 8 – Billy Haughton  (1968, 1975, 1976, 1980)

 Stakes record
 1:56 flat – Cam Fella (1982)

Queen City Pace winners

External links
YouTube video of Ralph Hanover winning the 1983 Queen City Pace

References

Harness racing in Canada
Recurring sporting events established in 1964
Sport in Toronto
1964 establishments in Ontario
1983 disestablishments in Ontario
Recurring sporting events disestablished in 1983